TMM may refer to:

Science 
 Transfer-matrix method, a statistical mechanics method
 Transfer-matrix method (optics), a method to describe wave propagation through stratified media
 Trimethylenemethane, a reactive organic compound and a ligand in organometallic chemistry

Software and business 
 Tell Me More (software), French language-learning software from Auralog
 Testing Maturity Model, a software process improvement model
 Too Much Media, an American software company based in New Jersey 
 Traffic Management Microkernel, a product of F5 Networks
 Translation memory manager, a software program to aid human translators

Other uses 
 Tell Me More, an American radio show on National Public Radio hosted by Michel Martin
 Texas Memorial Museum, a museum at the University of Texas at Austin in the United States
 Textbook of Military Medicine, a U.S. Army publication
 Theresa May, a Prime Minister of the United Kingdom, from her full name Theresa Mary May
 TMM, the former ISO 4217 code of the Turkmenistani manat, the currency of Turkmenistan
 TMM-1 mine, an anti-tank landmine